Alyaksandr Krotaw (born 19 April 1995) is a Belarusian professional footballer who plays for Molodechno.

References

External links 
 
 

1995 births
Living people
People from Puchavičy District
Sportspeople from Minsk Region
Belarusian footballers
Association football midfielders
FC Isloch Minsk Raion players
FC Torpedo Minsk players
FC Belshina Bobruisk players
FC Rukh Brest players
FC Chist players
FC Oshmyany players
FC Naftan Novopolotsk players
FC Lida players
FC Molodechno players